Ernst Laraque (born November 16, 1970) is a male judoka from Haiti, who won the bronze medal in the men's lightweight division (– 73 kg) at the 2003 Pan American Games. He represented his native country at two consecutive Summer Olympics, starting in 2000 in Sydney, Australia.

References
sports-reference

1970 births
Living people
Haitian male judoka
Judoka at the 2000 Summer Olympics
Judoka at the 2004 Summer Olympics
Judoka at the 2003 Pan American Games
Olympic judoka of Haiti
Pan American Games bronze medalists for Haiti
Pan American Games medalists in judo
Medalists at the 2003 Pan American Games
21st-century Haitian people